Hauerinidae is a large and diverse family of miliolid forams (Loeblich & Tappan, 1988) that includes genera distributed among various subfamilies in the Treatise (Loelich &Tappan 1964) as well as genera named and described since.

Diagnosis
Test  with a proloculus commonly followed by tubular chambers, two per whorl added in one to five or more planes of coiling. Less commonly the adult test may have more than two chambers per whorl or may be uncoiled and rectilinear. The aperture may be a simple opening at the end of the final chamber, often with a tooth, or may be cribrate with multiple openings.

Six subfamilies are recognized (Loeblich & Tappan, 1988)

Hauerininae
Miliolinellinae
Simoilinitinae
Sigmoilopsinae
Siphonoaptertinae
Tubinellinae

References

 Alfred R. Loeblich Jr and Helen Tappan, 1964. Sarcodina Chiefly "Thecamoebians" and Foraminiferida; Treatise on Invertebrate Paleontology, Part C Protista 2. Geological Society of America and University of Kansas Press. 
 Alfred R. Loeblich Jr and Helen Tappan,1988. Forminiferal Genera and their Classification. 
  Hauerinidae Fossilworks

Tubothalamea
Foraminifera families